That's the Way may refer to:

"That's the Way", a song recorded by The Honeycombs in 1965
"That's the Way", a song by Katrina and the Waves from their album Break of Hearts
"That's the Way" (1970 Led Zeppelin song)
"That's the Way" (Jo Dee Messina song)
"That's the Way (I Like It)", a song by KC and the Sunshine Band
"That's the Way (My Love Is)", a song by The Smashing Pumpkins

See also

All pages beginning with That's the Way